The Klas class, also referred to as the Klas Horn class, was a pair of  destroyers in service with the Swedish Navy from 1932 to 1958. They are sometimes considered part of the preceding s. The ships were involved in the Hårsfjärden disaster in 1941, in which both ships were damaged. Klas Uggla was raised but decommissioned, Klas Horn was repaired and continued to serve in the navy until 1958.

Description

The Klas class were an improved version of the preceding s and were sometimes considered part of the class.

The Klas-class destroyers main armament was three single /46 calibre guns and two triple  torpedo tubes. For anti-aircraft defence, the destroyers were equipped with two Vickers  cannon. These were later replaced with four  Bofors cannon. The destroyers were armed with two depth charge throwers for anti-submarine warfare and were issued 20 naval mines. The ships had a complement of 130.

Ships in class

Operational history
Both ships were laid down in 1929, with Klas Horn being constructed by Kockums and Klas Uggla built by the Karlskrona Navy Yard. Klas Horn was launched on 13 June 1931 and Klas Uggla on 18 June 1931. They were both completed in 1932. The Klas-class destroyers were sometimes used to escort Swedish ore carriers and German troop transports. On 17 September 1941, an unsolved explosion at Hårsfjärden Naval Base known as the Hårsfjärden disaster took place. Both Klas-class destroyers were sunk in the explosion along with the destroyer . In the explosion, thirty-three were killed and seventeen wounded from the three ships. Klas Horn was raised and returned to service, using parts from the non-repairable Klas Uggla. The vessel's anti-aircraft weaponry was increased to six 25 mm cannon. Klas Horn remained in active service until 1958. From 1958 until 1967, the ship was used as a training hulk. On 14 November 1967, Klas Horn was sold for scrap.

Citations

Sources
 
 
 

 
Destroyers of Sweden
Destroyer classes